Chérif Souleymane, also known as Chérif Soulegmane, (born 20 October 1944) is a former Guinean footballer. He is considered among the finest footballers Guinea has ever produced. He was named the France Football African Footballer of the Year and the African Footballer of the Year (the only Guinean to receive that honour) in 1972 while playing with Hafia FC in Conakry.

Career
Born in Kindia the son of a chauffeur/mechanic, Souleymane moved to East Germany when he was 17 to study to become a plumber, but switched to architecture because, he later stated, it made it easier for him to play football. He played for SC Neubrandenburg in the second-tier DDR-Liga for two seasons, from 1962 to 1964.

He returned to his home country and spent the rest of his playing career with top-tier Hafia FC, initially known as Conakry II when he joined the club. He played for Hafia from 1964 to 1978. Hafia was a powerhouse in Guinea and in Africa during this period, winning the Guinée Championnat National, the top national league, from 1965 to 1968 and from 1971 to 1979. In international competition, it won the African Cup of Champions Clubs three times, in 1972, 1975 and 1977, and was the runner-up in 1976, during Souleymane's tenure. In the 1976 African Cup of Nations, Guinea came in second, despite never losing a game, Souleymane's sole regret of his playing career. He was also on the Guinea national football team from 1965 through 1977, and competed for Guinea at the 1968 Summer Olympics with the national team. In 11 FIFA appearances, he scored three goals.

He also coached nine FIFA games, amassing a record of three wins, two draws and four losses. He made his debut at the 1985 inaugural FIFA U-16 World Championship in China; his team defeated the United States 1-0, advanced out of its group and placed fourth.

As of December 2013, Souleymane has been the Technical Director (Director Technique) of the Guinean Football Federation since 2004.

References

1944 births
Living people
People from Kindia
Association football midfielders
Guinean footballers
Guinean expatriate footballers
Guinea international footballers
1976 African Cup of Nations players
Olympic footballers of Guinea
Footballers at the 1968 Summer Olympics
Hafia FC players
African Footballer of the Year winners
Guinean football managers
1. FC Neubrandenburg 04 players
Expatriate footballers in East Germany